The second season of the Attack on Titan anime television series was produced by IG Port's Wit Studio, chief directed by Tetsurō Araki and directed by Masashi Koizuka, with Yasuko Kobayashi handling series composition and Kyōji Asano providing character designs. It covers the "Clash of the Titans" arc (chapters 35–50) from the original manga by Hajime Isayama. It was broadcast on MBS TV from April 1 to June 17, 2017, and later aired on Tokyo MX, FBS, TOS, HTB, TV Aichi and BS11. Funimation and Crunchyroll streamed the second season on their respective websites, while Adult Swim aired Funimation's English dubbed version.

The season follows Eren Jaeger and his friends from the 104th Training Corps who have just begun to become full members of the Survey Corps. After fighting the Female Titan, Eren finds no time to rest as a horde of Titans is approaching Wall Rose and the battle for humanity continues. As the Survey Corps races to save the wall, they uncover more about the invading Titans and the dark secrets of their own members.

The score is composed by Hiroyuki Sawano.

The season, like the previous season, received universal acclaim from audiences and critics, lauding it for its story, and characters; in addition to its action, dark tone, music, and animation.



Episode list

Music

Sawano returned to compose the soundtrack for the second season, with the 2-CD soundtrack released on June 7, 2017, by Pony Canyon. In addition to music composed for Season 2, the soundtrack also featured any and all tracks composed for other media in-between seasons one and two, such as compilation films and OVAs. 

Vocals were provided by yosh, Gemie, mpi, Mica Caldito, Mika Kobayashi and Benjamin.

Track listing

Home media release

Japanese

English

References

External links
  

Attack on Titan episode lists
2017 Japanese television seasons